Mary Morrison may refer to:
Mary Anna Jackson née Morrison (1831–1915), wife of Stonewall Jackson
Mary Anne Morrison (born 1937), lady-in-waiting to Elizabeth II
Mary Lane Morrison (1907–1994), American preservationist
Mary Louise Morrison (born 1926), Canadian soprano, see 1926 in Canada
Mary Morison or Morrison (1771–1791), Scottish girl thought to be the "lovely Mary Morison" of Robert Burns' poem